Joseph Wickham may refer to:

 Joseph Dresser Wickham (1797–1891), American minister
 Joe Wickham (1890–1968), General Secretary of the Football Association of Ireland
 Joseph H. Wickham (1911–2000), Brevard County, Florida politician